Lark Rise to Candleford is a British television costume drama series, adapted by the BBC from Flora Thompson's trilogy of semi-autobiographical novels about the English countryside, published between 1939 and 1943. The first episode aired on 13 January 2008 on BBC One and BBC HD in the UK. In the U.S., the series began airing on select PBS stations in the spring of 2009. A third series began airing in the UK on 10 January 2010. The fourth and final series began on 9 January 2011 on BBC One and BBC One HD, and was filmed during August 2010.

It was announced on 22 January 2011 that the show would not be returning for a fifth series. The final series concluded on 13 February 2011.

Premise
The series is set in the small Oxfordshire hamlet of Lark Rise, and the wealthier neighbouring market town of Candleford towards the end of the 19th century. The series chronicles the daily lives of farmworkers, craftsmen and gentry observing the characters in loving, boisterous and competing communities of families, rivals, friends and neighbours.

The story is seen through the eyes of a young girl, Laura Timmins (Olivia Hallinan), as she leaves Lark Rise to start a new life under the wing of her mother's cousin, the independent and effervescent Dorcas Lane (Julia Sawalha), who is postmistress at the local post office in Candleford. Through these two characters, viewers experience the force of friendship as Laura and Dorcas see each other through the best and worst of times.

Cast

Main cast

Guest stars
Lorraine Ashbourne as Lil Spicer (Series 2, 1 episode)
Samantha Bond as Celestia Brice-Coulson (Series 2, 1 episode)
Rosie Cavaliero as Mrs Mullins (Series 3, 1 episode)
Camille Coduri as Patty (Series 1, 1 episode)
Tom Conti as Mr. Reppington (Series 3, 1 episode)
Ben Daniels as Mr. Rushton (Series 1, 1 episode)
Phil Davis as Arthur Ashlow (Series 1, 1 episode)
Oliver Dimsdale as George Ellison (Series 2, 4 episode)
Michelle Fairley as Elizabeth Patterson (Series 2, 10 episode)
Burn Gorman as Benedict Marley (Series 4, 1 episode)
Nigel Harman as Samuel Braby (Series 1, 1 episode)
Stephen Campbell Moore as James Delafield (Series 1, 1 episode)
Hattie Morahan as Miss Enid (Series 3, 1 episode)
Ronald Pickup as Old Peg Leg (Series 3, 1 episode)
Robert Pugh as Walter Arless (Series 2, 1 episode; mentioned throughout Series 1)
Paul Ritter as Mr Steerforth (Series 4, 1 episode)
Claire Skinner as Mrs Macey (Series 1, 2 episodes)
Sheridan Smith as Cinderella Doe (Series 2, 1 episode)
Maggie Steed as Mrs Herring (Series 2, 1 episode)
Peter Vaughan as Reverend Ellison (Series 1, 2 episodes)
Danny Webb as Mr Macey (Series 1, 1 episode)

Filming
Interior scenes were shot in a warehouse on Beeches Industrial Estate, in Yate, South Gloucestershire. The villages of Lark Rise and Candleford were both created from scratch on farms in Box and Neston Park, near Corsham in Wiltshire. According to the BBC planning application, Hatt Farm in Box was used because of its proximity to existing cornfields and farm buildings, and Park Farm in Neston Park was chosen for its unspoilt character and attractive traditional buildings.

The outdoor filming at these locations for the first series took 25 days, spread over a 5-month period. The country scenes, including all the comings and goings of the lord of the manor, were shot at Chavenage House north of Tetbury, Gloucestershire.

Episodes

Series 1 (2008)

Series 2 (2008–2009)

Series 3 (2010)

Series 4 (2011)

Cancellation
It was announced on 22 January 2011 that the show would not be returning for a fifth series. The decision caused viewer complaints, prompting BBC One controller Danny Cohen to say, "Lark Rise to Candleford has been a truly wonderful part of the BBC One schedule and we are incredibly grateful to writer Bill Gallagher and the team. But we feel the time is right to make room for new dramas which we hope will be taken to the nation's hearts in the same way."

Following that announcement, many viewers took to setting up and signing online campaigns to see the show recommissioned. In response, Ben Stephenson of the BBC finally announced the decision was based on the departure of writer and executive producer Bill Gallagher, whose "creative energy" was considered essential to the series.

Notes

References

External links 

2000s British drama television series
2010s British drama television series
2008 British television series debuts
2011 British television series endings
BBC television dramas
Costume drama television series
Television series set in the 19th century
Television shows set in Oxfordshire